Luis Alberto Pacheco Castillo (born 30 April 1968) is a Venezuelan football manager.

Career
Born in Barinas, Pacheco's first major work occurred in 2014, as he was named in charge of Segunda División side Atlético Socopó. In 2016, he took over Hermanos Colmenarez, taking them to Tercera División in the following year.

After Hermanos merged with Madeira Club de Lara and achieved promotion to the second level, Pacheco was still in charge of the club. He was again manager of the side for the 2019 and 2020 campaigns, the latter in the Primera División.

On 25 July 2022, Pacheco was sacked by Hermanos Colmenarez.

References

External links

1968 births
Living people
People from Mérida, Mérida
Venezuelan football managers
Venezuelan Primera División managers
Venezuelan Segunda División managers
C.D. Hermanos Colmenarez managers